In coding theory and information theory, a Z-channel (binary asymmetric channel) is a communications channel used to model the behaviour of some data storage systems.

Definition 
A Z-channel is a channel with binary input and binary output, where each 0 bit is transmitted correctly, but each 1 bit has probability p of being transmitted incorrectly as a 0, and probability 1–p of being transmitted correctly as a 1. In other words, if X and Y are the random variables describing the probability distributions of the input and the output of the channel, respectively, then the crossovers of the channel are characterized by the conditional probabilities:

Capacity 
The channel capacity  of the Z-channel  with the crossover 1 → 0 probability p, when the input random variable X is distributed according to the Bernoulli distribution with probability  for the occurrence of 0, is given by the following equation:

where  for the binary entropy function .

For small p, the capacity is approximated by

as compared to the capacity  of the binary symmetric channel with crossover probability p.

{| class="toccolours collapsible collapsed" width="80%" style="text-align:left"
!Calculation
|-
|

To find the maximum we differentiate

And we see the maximum is attained for

|}

For any p,  (i.e. more 0s should be transmitted than 1s) because transmitting a 1 introduces noise.

Bounds on the size of an asymmetric-error-correcting code 
Define the following distance function  on the words  of length n transmitted via a Z-channel

A code  of length n is said to be t-asymmetric-error-correcting if for any two codewords , one has . Denote by  the maximum number of codewords in a t-asymmetric-error-correcting code of length n.

The Varshamov bound.
For n≥1 and t≥1,

The constant-weight code bound.
For n > 2t ≥ 2, let the sequence B0, B1, ..., Bn-2t-1 be defined as
Then

Notes

References 
 
 
 
 

Coding theory
Information theory
Inequalities